William Brown (born 5 June 1998) is an Australian racing driver currently competing in the Repco Supercars Championship with Erebus Motorsport, driving the No. 9 Holden ZB Commodore. In 2017, Brown received the Mike Kable Young Gun Award, and was also awarded The Peter Brock Medal by the Confederation of Australian Motorsport (CAMS) for his outstanding year in racing. 

With championship wins in both the Australian Formula 4 and the Australian Toyota Racing Series in 2016, Brown became one of only five drivers in Australian motorsport history to achieve two national racing titles in one year.

Early career

Karting 
Brown started his career in karting in 2011 at the age of thirteen. He won numerous championships in his junior years and had an 80% win rate. He moved up the ranks and competed in the inaugural CAMS Jayco Australian Formula 4 Championship in 2015 with team BRM.

Formula 4 

On the back of his karting form, Brown was signed by AGI Sport to race in the inaugural FIA Formula 4 Australia Championship and claimed victory in the first ever race. Brown was a championship contender for the Formula 4 championship in 2015, winning 3 of the 15 races that season. He finished third overall and crowned Rookie of the Year after his impressive debut.

In 2016, he signed with BRM and recorded six race wins and 12 podiums from 18 races to be crowned Formula 4 Australia Champion. Brown took the title with one round and one race remaining after a controversial race in Tasmania, where he was involved in a collision with rivals Nick Rowe and Jordan Love.

Formula Ford 

Brown competed in the 2016 Australian Formula Ford Championship. Despite missing the first three rounds due to a date clash with Formula 4, Brown would go on to secure P2 in the 2016 championship, with multiple wins and podiums.

Toyota 86 Racing Series 

Brown also competed in the one-make Australian Toyota 86 Racing Series in 2016, claiming the Series Title in a field of 39 drivers. With championship wins in both the Australian Formula 4 and the Australian Toyota Racing Series in 2016, Brown became one of only five drivers in Australian motorsport history to achieve two national racing titles in one year.

Professional career

Super2 Series 
For the 2017 racing season, Brown was picked up by Eggleston Motorsport to replace the outgoing Liam McAdam. He scored a best finish of 3rd at Symmons Plains and was on course to win the final race of the season in Newcastle before blowing a gearbox. He finished ninth in the championship overall.

TCR Series
In 2019 we drove in the new TCR Australia Touring Car Series. He was crowned champion with one round remaining.

2020 Junior Driver Program 
In 2020 Hyundai Motorsport named Brown in the 2020 Junior Driver Program as one of four drivers who will race Hyndai Motorsport TCR cars in some of the leading championships in the category. Outside of Europe, Will Brown will represent the Customer Racing Junior Driver Program. Brown dominated the inaugural Australian TCR season with 7 wins in his debut driving TCR cars. He remains with HMO Customer Racing team to defend his title.

Erebus Motorsport

2018
Brown was named as a Supercars Endurance Cup co-driver, partnering Anton de Pasquale with Erebus Motorsport, where he immediately showed his elite driving ability throughout the 3 race series. He continued to make solid progress in his Dunlop Super2 Series landing P6 in the 2018 Driver’s Championship with Eggleston Motorsport

2019
Again partnering with Anton de Pasquale at Erebus Motorsport in the Supercars championship, Brown’s talent was on show finishing P2 behind Craig Lowndes and ahead of Garth Tander in the Co-driver Race, taking his first podium in the series. Furthermore, Brown also accepted a drive in the inaugural S5000 series, competing alongside former Ferrari F1 legend Rubens Barrichello.

2020
Brown began 2020 with a multi year signing with Penrite Racing, that would see him compete in the Virgin Australia Supercars series as a co-driver to David Reynolds in 2020, before becoming a full time driver for the team from 2021. The Supercars Enduro Cup was reduced to a single race at Bathurst for 2020, where Brown and Reynolds finished P15 due to engine issues.

2021

Brown performed strongly in his first full-time Supercars season, achieving his first Supercars podium with second place in Race 22 at Sydney Motorsport. He went on to score a maiden Armor All Pole Position the next weekend, starting in P1 for Race 23 - again at Sydney Motorsport Park - but had to wait until Race 28 to claim his first Supercars race win. A stunning drive saw the Red Bull Australia drivers pressure Brown, but he held his nerve for become the 82nd driver to win an ATCC/Supercars race. He is the first rookie driver to win a Supercars race since 2013, when Scott McLaughlin and Chaz Mostert both took victories in their first full-time season.

Business career
In 2021, Brown partnered with fellow Supercars driver David Reynolds to create the Cartopia platform, with the goal to create a better car sales experience for both dealers and consumers. Launching in January 2021, Cartopia offers online vehicle search and purchasing via its website.

Career results

Karting career summary

Circuit racing career

* Season still in progress.

Complete Super2 Series results
(key) (Round results only), (2020 Race results only)

TCR Australia results

Supercars Championship results

Bathurst 1000 results

Complete Bathurst 12 Hour results

Complete S5000 results

References

External links
 Profile on Driver DataBase
 Profile at Racing Reference
 V8 Supercars Official Profile
 Will Brown Official Website
 Cartopia.com.au

Australian racing drivers
1998 births
Living people
Supercars Championship drivers
Australian F4 Championship drivers